John Brogan (born 18 May 1958, in Glasgow), is a Scottish former footballer, who played as a defender.

Brogan began his career with Partick Thistle. He didn't play for the first team, and moved to rivals Clyde. He stayed with Clyde for 7 seasons, before dropping out of the senior game to join Glasgow Perthshire.

He is regularly a guest of honour at various Clyde functions.

Honours
 Scottish Second Division: 1977–78, 1981–82

References

External links

Living people
1958 births
Scottish footballers
Partick Thistle F.C. players
Clyde F.C. players
Glasgow Perthshire F.C. players
Association football defenders
Scottish Football League players